Marco Antonio Guarini (Ferrara 1570 – 1638) was an Italian historian and scholar, nephew of Giovanni Battista Guarini and author of the Compendio Historico and of the Famiglie illustri della città di Ferrara.

The Compendio Historico
His principal work is the Compendio Historico, also known as:

In his work, Guarini cites Ugo de' Pagani:

And also Raffaella Aleotti:

Bibliography

See also
Giovanni Battista Guarini
Giammaria Mazzucchelli
Giusto Fontanini
Raffaella Aleotti
Hugo de Paganis

External links
 
 

17th-century Italian historians
Place of birth missing
1570 births
1638 deaths
Writers from Ferrara